In geometry, an apeirogonal tiling is a tessellation of the Euclidean plane, hyperbolic plane, or some other two-dimensional space by apeirogons. Tilings of this type include:
Order-2 apeirogonal tiling, Euclidean tiling of two half-spaces
Order-3 apeirogonal tiling, hyperbolic tiling with 3 apeirogons around a vertex
Order-4 apeirogonal tiling, hyperbolic tiling with 4 apeirogons around a vertex
Order-5 apeirogonal tiling, hyperbolic tiling with 5 apeirogons around a vertex
Infinite-order apeirogonal tiling, hyperbolic tiling with an infinite number of apeirogons around a vertex

See also
Apeirogonal antiprism
Apeirogonal prism
Apeirohedron

Apeirogonal tilings